The Fiat 507 is a passenger car produced by Italian automobile manufacturer Fiat between 1926 and 1927. The car was developed from the 505 model, with a modified suspension and brakes.

Fiat produced 3,700 507's during its production run.

References
Fiat Personenwagen, by Fred Steiningen, 1994. 

507
Cars introduced in 1926